SS California was a British  steam turbine ocean liner built in Glasgow in 1923 for the Anchor Line. In 1939 the Royal Navy requisitioned her.

Building
Alexander Stephen & Sons of Linthouse, Glasgow built California for Henderson Brothers. Photographs of the ship taken in the 1930s show only one funnel, meaning a furnace refit, or that the original fore and aft funnels were dummies. Supporting the latter idea, the 1925 photograph of the top panel shows the smoke from the middle funnel.

Career

Pre-War
The California carried passengers between Glasgow and New York via Derry and Boston, and she made about 20 crossings in winter seasons from Liverpool to Bombay.
With the increase in international tourism, the ship's passenger accommodations were redesigned in May 1929 for 206 passengers in cabin class, 440 in tourist class, and 485 in third class.

World War II

In 1939 she was requisitioned by the Admiralty and converted to an Armed Merchant Cruiser, and from 1942 she was a troopship.

Loss
On 8 July 1943 the small fast Convoy Faith, comprising , the troopships  and California, and escorted by the destroyer  and frigate , sailed Port Glasgow, Scotland, for Freetown, Sierra Leone. On the evening of 10 July the convoy rendezvoused with the Canadian destroyer   WSW of Land's End.

Accurate high-altitude bombing left Duchess of York and California in flames. The attack cost the lives of 46 servicemen and crew, and both ships were abandoned. It was feared the flames from the troopships would attract U-boats, so in the early hours of 12 July they were sunk by Royal Navy torpedoes in position .

Footnotes

References

External links

BBC World War II People's War

1923 ships
World War II Auxiliary cruisers of the Royal Navy
Ships built on the River Clyde
Maritime incidents in July 1943
Merchant ships of the United Kingdom
Ocean liners
Ships sunk by German aircraft
Steamships of the United Kingdom
Troop ships of the United Kingdom
World War II merchant ships of the United Kingdom
World War II shipwrecks in the Atlantic Ocean